The Williams FW12 was a Formula One racing car used by the Williams team for the  season. An updated version, the FW12C, was used for 12 of the 16 races of the  season. The FW12 was Williams's first naturally aspirated car since the FW08 and FW08C used in the 1982 and 1983 season.

FW12
In its original guise the FW12 featured a Judd CV 3.5 V8. In 1988 the car was unsuccessful for Williams after two years of domination with the FW12's predecessor, the FW11 and FW11B, through use of the all-powerful V6 Honda turbo engine. Williams actually had an existing contract to continue using the Honda engines in 1988. However, the team's refusal to dump Nigel Mansell and replace him with Honda's test driver Satoru Nakajima for the  season, as well as Honda being reportedly unhappy with Williams management for allegedly not honouring the number one driver status of Nelson Piquet's contract which contributed to both Piquet and Mansell losing the 1986 Drivers' Championship to McLaren's Alain Prost, saw the relationship between Honda and the team sour and the Japanese giant pulled out of the contract, announcing at the 1987 Hungarian Grand Prix a three-year deal to supply their engines to McLaren from 1988.

Early in the season the FW12 was described by both Nigel Mansell and Riccardo Patrese as being pathetically slow in a straight line. The facts backed up the drivers' claims. This compared to the over  recorded by McLaren and Lotus with their Honda turbo engines. That speed deficit, along with trouble from the reactive suspension system, saw only one point scored before the mid-season British Grand Prix, when Riccardo Patrese finished 6th in Monaco. For his part, Mansell - who had won 11 races though 1986 and 1987, more than any other driver - failed to finish the first seven races of the 1988 season.

Williams had debuted their own version of the computer controlled "active suspension" on the FW11 at the 1987 Italian Grand Prix, with Nelson Piquet taking victory in the system's debut (it was called "Williams Reactive Ride" by the team as Lotus had the copyright on the "active" name in F1). Williams made revisions to the system in the off-season, deciding to use it on the FW12 with the hope it would be an advantage over the other non-turbo cars and put it on a more equal footing with the more powerful turbo-powered teams. Unfortunately though, the revisions had a detrimental effect. The main problem encountered by the team was that air was getting into the hydraulics and disturbing the computerised settings making the FW12's handling unpredictable, with both Mansell and Patrese pointing out on numerous occasions that the suspension settings were changing from lap to lap, and sometimes from corner to corner. Additionally, the onboard computer which was needed to run the system not only added weight to the car (approximately ), but also drew power from the car's engine to run properly (approximately 5%). This was acceptable when the team started using the system as they had the use of Honda's  V6 turbo.

It was at Silverstone for the British Grand Prix that Williams Technical Director Patrick Head decided to dump the reactive suspension system for a more conventional one. This was a process that Head had previously stated could not be done without a great deal of development and work, but at the team's home Grand Prix, a race it had won the previous two years, the situation was desperate as Mansell had finished the first qualifying session 13th while Patrese was 30th, some 14 seconds slower than the final starting position of 26th. Overnight after Friday qualifying the team worked tirelessly to convert the cars. While Head admitted it was a bodge job done on the fly and would have to be re-worked later, both Mansell and Patrese expressed delight with the car, Mansell qualifying 11th while Patrese improved by 18 seconds to start 15th. The race was also a boost for Williams as Mansell drove his car in heavy rain to a hard fought 2nd place, his first points of the season, setting fastest lap along the way (one of only two non-turbo fastest laps of the season).

Mansell was forced to miss the Belgian and Italian races because of chickenpox and was substituted by Martin Brundle and Jean-Louis Schlesser consecutively. Brundle had previously driven F1 for Tyrrell and Zakspeed from 1984-87. Schlesser drove in what would be the only World Championship F1 race of his career. He had previously driven a RAM-Ford to 6th in the non-championship 1983 Race of Champions, then unsuccessfully tried to qualify the car a week later for the French Grand Prix and had not driven an F1 car since.

Despite a long and successful career which has included twice winning the Paris-Dakar Rally, Schlesser will forever be remembered for his drive at Monza, as it was his clash on lap 49 of 51 with race leader Ayrton Senna in the McLaren-Honda at the Variante de Rettifilio chicane which took Senna out of the race. This was McLaren's only loss of the season, and handed Ferrari's Gerhard Berger and Michele Alboreto an emotional 1-2 result only a month after the death of Enzo Ferrari.

The FW12 proved competitive for Williams in the last few races of the 1988 season. Despite both Mansell and Patrese retiring from the Portuguese Grand Prix (Round 13), better was to come at the next race in Spain with Mansell finishing 2nd behind the McLaren of Alain Prost, while Patrese finished 5th (the race was also Mansell's second and only point scoring race for the season after finishing runner up in both  and ). Mansell was then to retire from the last two races of the season in both Japan (accident with the Lotus of Nelson Piquet) and Australia (brake failure), ending his first run with the team after four seasons and 13 wins, while Patrese would finish 6th and 4th in both races.

After winning the Formula One Constructors' Championships in both 1986 and 1987 and the Drivers' Championship with Piquet in 1987, Williams dropped to 7th in the standings in 1988, scoring only 20 points for the season in a year when the Honda powered McLaren MP4/4's of 1988 World Champion Ayrton Senna and his team mate, dual World Champion Alain Prost, won 15 of the season's 16 races in the single most dominant season in Formula One history.

FW12C
During the 1988 season, Williams worked with their new engine supplier Renault to develop the RS1 3.5 V10 engine. Williams designed a test mule for the engine named FW12B, very much like the Judd-powered car Williams used for the 1988 season except the mule was designed to accommodate the extra length of a V10 engine and not a V8 like the race cars used. For the  season the Renault V10 engine was used. This was the first Renault powered Williams F1 car and also saw Renault's re-entry into Formula One after stopping the supply of their turbocharged engines following the  season. The Renault engine was designed under the direction of longtime Renault Sport engineer Bernard Dudot; the design and development of Renault’s V10 started at least a year before Honda began developing their V10 engine largely due to Renault’s short-lived withdrawal from F1 as an engine supplier at the end of the 1986 season. The updated and revised FW12C showed its potential in the season opening Brazilian Grand Prix with Patrese qualifying 2nd and leading the race from the start in what was his 176th Grand Prix start, which was then a record. Patrese also set the fastest lap of the race before retiring in front of the pits with a broken harmonic balancer.

During this time the car scored its only win when Thierry Boutsen (who had replaced Mansell in the team) scored his first win at the rain affected Canadian Grand Prix, and with Patrese finishing second it was Williams's first 1–2 result since the 1987 Mexican Grand Prix. Patrese, who had his best season to date after consecutive 2nd-place finishes in Mexico, Phoenix and Canada, followed by a 3rd in France, also scored the car's only pole position at the Hungarian Grand Prix. He then comfortably led the race until lap 54 when a hole in the radiator caused the car to overheat into retirement.

By the time of the Italian Grand Prix at Monza, it had become obvious that the limit of the FW12C had been reached, with the team starting to fall behind both McLaren, with their Honda V10 engine, and Ferrari with their V12, while also being consistently challenged by Benetton and the Cosworth built Ford V8 of which they had exclusive use. Williams, who had decided to continue with the car, preferring to get its successor, the FW13, right before making its race debut, decided after Italy, where Boutsen finished 3rd with Patrese 4th, that the FW12C would be retired and the new car introduced for Portugal. The main reason for the late appearance of the FW13 was that it had originally been designed for Williams' active suspension system and it had to be re-designed and tested with normal or 'passive' suspension with Patrick Head deciding to iron the bugs out before debuting the car. Patrese then preferred to go back to the FW12C for the Spanish Grand Prix, finishing 5th in the last Formula One race for the car.

1976 world champion James Hunt test drove the FW12C as a prelude to a potential comeback. He had a secret test at the Paul Ricard Circuit in December 1989 and set competitive times, but eventually decided against returning to the cockpit and remained with BBC TV in 1990.

Overall, the Judd and Renault powered Williams FW12 and FW12C cars scored 1 win, 1 pole position, 2 fastest laps and 9 podium finishes in their 29 races.

Complete Formula One results
(key) (results shown in bold indicate pole position; results in italics indicate fastest lap)

* 23 points in  scored using Williams FW13

References

Williams Formula One cars